Windlesham Moor is a country house and, for a time in the 20th century a royal residence, at Windlesham in the English county of Surrey. In its capacity as a royal residence, it was, for nearly two years in the late 1940s, the home of Princess (later Queen) Elizabeth and her husband Philip, Duke of Edinburgh.

History 
Philip Hill bought the Victorian home and grounds in a state of disrepair in 1942 for £40,000.  Later the Royal Family bought the renovated Sunninghill Park house and park from Hill. He renovated the house in 1944. It was rented furnished from his widow, Mrs. Warwick Bryant, for Princess Elizabeth and Philip, Duke of Edinburgh between 1947 and 4 July 1949.

The house has by design four reception rooms including a reception hall, dining room, a  drawing room, and a Chinese room. Other room names during the royal tenure included a study, games room, and loggia and five main bedrooms. The nursery comprised two guest rooms joined.

The house bore with it , largely of light woodland in the acidic heath of Surrey Heath on the elevated Bagshot Formation (Bagshot sands).

Neighbours
To the north and west is (in Berkshire) part of Swinley Forest lying in the Crown Estate, separated by the Ascot to Guildford Line from its heart.  To the south is Erl Wood Manor European research laboratory established in 1967 for Eli Lilly and Company, a USA-based pharmaceutical company.  To the south-west corner across the minor train line is a private racecourse and to the east are smallholdings and gardens of detached homes such as Windlesham Hill Farm which is divided into three.  A 21st-century care home has been established on part of the former farm.

Present 
The house was acquired by Sheikh Hamdan bin Rashid Al Maktoum, who carried out significant renovation and extensions, added a security gatehouse in 2002, and included the houses "Winklands" and "Rose Cottage" into the estate.  From July to September) Al Maktoum, his family, and other Arab dignitaries live in the house. Occasionally the Sheikh's guests live there at other times. The property is maintained by property managers, gardeners and security personnel.

A painting of the house and gardens circa 1934, attributed to Winston Churchill, was discovered and sold at auction in September 2008.

References 

Country houses in Surrey
Royal residences in England